William O. Wallace (August 9, 1906–November 4, 1968)  was an American set decorator who worked throughout the 1940s and 1950s in multiple Hollywood productions. He was Oscar-nominated in 1948 for Jean Negulesco’s Johnny Belinda, and also worked on Young Man with a Horn (1950), Battle Cry (1955) and Nicholas Ray’s seminal Rebel Without a Cause in 1956. He moved into television in the late 1950s, and was chief set decorator on Maverick.

References

External links

1906 births
1968 deaths
American set decorators